The men's discus throw event was part of the track and field athletics programme at the 1928 Summer Olympics. The competition was held on Wednesday, August 1, 1928. Thirty-four discus throwers from 19 nations competed. The maximum number of athletes per nation was 4. The event was won by Bud Houser, the second man to successfully defend Olympic gold in the discus throw (after Martin Sheridan). It was the fifth American victory in the event. As in 1924, silver went to Finland (this time by Antero Kivi) and bronze to the United States (James Corson).

Background

This was the eighth appearance of the event, which is one of 12 athletics events to have been held at every Summer Olympics. The returning finalists from 1924 were defending champion Bud Houser of the United States and fifth-place finisher Ketil Askildt of Norway. Houser had also taken the world record in 1926 and was the favorite in this competition.

Chile, Japan, Mexico, the Netherlands, and Romania each made their debut in the men's discus throw. The United States made its eighth appearance, having competed in every edition of the Olympic men's discus throw to date.

Competition format

The competition continued to use the single, divided-final format in use since 1896. Each athlete received three throws, with the top six receiving an additional three throws.

Records

These were the standing world and Olympic records (in metres) prior to the 1928 Summer Olympics.

At first James Corson set a new Olympic record in the second round of the qualification with 47.00 metres. In the third round of the qualification Bud Houser bettered the Olympic record with 47.32 metres.

Schedule

Results

The best six discus throwers qualified for the final. The throwing order is not available and the throwing series are only available for the best six throwers. The final was held on the same day and started at 2 p.m.

References

Sources
 Official Olympic Report
 

Discus
Discus throw at the Olympics
Men's events at the 1928 Summer Olympics